Wyoming Valley West High School is a public high school in Plymouth,  Luzerne County, Pennsylvania.  It is the only public high school in the Wyoming Valley West School District. The current building was completed in 1978.

Students and faculty 
With 1482 students and 84 FTE teachers, the student-to-teacher ratio at Wyoming Valley West High School is 17.6:1, as compared to the state average of 16:1.

The student body is 79% white and 21% non-white, as compared with the state average of 34% minority enrollment.

Sports 
The school's mascot is a warrior from the ancient Greek province of Sparta.

Wyoming Valley West is in PIAA District 2.

"The Wyoming Valley West field hockey team defeated Palmyra 2-1 in the PIAA Class "AA" Championship. "

"This is the first Class 2A state championship for Wyoming Valley West. The Spartans won the Class 3A championship in 2003. "

AAA sports 
 Boys'/girls' cross country
 Boys'/girls' soccer
 Boys'/girls' swimming and diving
 Boys'/girls' tennis
 Boys'/girls' track and field
 Boys'/girls' volleyball
 Boys' wrestling
 Girls' field hockey

AAAA sports 
 Boys' baseball
 Girls' softball
 Boys'/girls' basketball
 Boys' football
 Boys' golf
 Boys'/girls' indoor track and field
 Boys'/girls' water polo

Notable alumni 
 Karen Aqua - filmmaker and animator
 Jimy Hettes - professional MMA fighter,  Ultimate Fighting Championship
 Aaron Kaufer - member of the Pennsylvania House of Representatives
 Kait Kerrigan - playwright, lyricist, book writer
 Warren Lahr - drafted by Pittsburgh Steelers, played 11 seasons with Cleveland Browns
 Alec Ryncavage - member of the Pennsylvania House of Representatives
 Jeffrey J. Selingo - author, journalist

References

External links
 publicschoolsreport.com
 city-data.com
 publicschoolreview.com

Public high schools in Pennsylvania
Schools in Luzerne County, Pennsylvania